Winterland Airport  is  southwest of Winterland, Newfoundland and Labrador, Canada.

The airport is classified as an airport of entry by Nav Canada and is staffed by the Canada Border Services Agency (CBSA). CBSA officers at this airport can handle general aviation aircraft only, with no more than 15 passengers.

References

Registered aerodromes in Newfoundland and Labrador